Evando Spinassé Camillato (born 7 March 1977), commonly known as Evando, is a Brazilian professional football manager and former player.

Playing career
Evando was born in Timóteo, Minas Gerais, but represented Vitória as a youth. He made his first team debut during the 1995 season in the Série A, aged only 18.

In January 1997, Evando moved abroad and joined Spanish Segunda División side Villarreal CF on loan until June. He made his debut abroad on 23 February by starting in a 3–1 home win against CD Toledo, but only featured in three further matches before returning to his parent club.

In 1998, Evando joined Vitória de Guimarães of the Primeira Liga on loan for one year. Upon returning, he spent a six-month spell at Goiás also in a temporary deal before being bought outright by the Portuguese side in early 2000.

Evandro rarely settled into a team in the following campaigns, being loaned to Santa Cruz, Portuguesa Santista and Estrela Amadora before leaving Vitória in 2004 as his contract expired. He immediately returned to Brazil and signed for Avaí.

On 12 January 2005, after scoring nine goals in the previous campaign, Evando signed for Santos, but left the club in May and joined Ponte Preta. In December, he agreed to a deal with Fluminense.

Evando returned to Avaí for 2007, but soon moved abroad and joined Al-Shamal. In the following year, he rejoined his previous club for a third spell, before moving back to Ponte in June 2009. He then represented Mirassol and Náutico before rejoining Avaí in February 2011.

In 2012, after representing Ituano and Grêmio Barueri during the year, Evando retired at the age of 35 with his main club Avaí.

Coaching career
Immediately after retiring Evando continued to work for his last club Avaí, helping in the coordination of the club's football schools across the Santa Catarina state. Ahead of the 2015 season, he became the club's permanent assistant manager.

On 22 August 2016, after the dismissal of Silas, Evando was named interim manager for one match; he returned to his previous duties after the arrival of Claudinei Oliveira. On 13 October 2019, after manager Alberto Valentim moved to Botafogo, he was permanently appointed manager of the main squad.

Honours

Player

Club
Vitória
Campeonato Baiano: 1995, 1996

Goiás
Campeonato Brasileiro Série B: 1999

Avaí
Campeonato Catarinense: 2009, 2012

International
Brazil U20
Toulon Tournament: 1996

References

External links

Evando profile at Futebol de Goyaz 

1977 births
Living people
Sportspeople from Minas Gerais
Brazilian footballers
Association football forwards
Campeonato Brasileiro Série A players
Campeonato Brasileiro Série B players
Esporte Clube Vitória players
Goiás Esporte Clube players
Associação Atlética Portuguesa (Santos) players
Santa Cruz Futebol Clube players
Avaí FC players
Santos FC players
Associação Atlética Ponte Preta players
Fluminense FC players
Mirassol Futebol Clube players
Clube Náutico Capibaribe players
Ituano FC players
Grêmio Barueri Futebol players
Segunda División players
Villarreal CF players
Primeira Liga players
Liga Portugal 2 players
Vitória S.C. players
C.F. Estrela da Amadora players
Qatar Stars League players
Al-Shamal SC players
Brazilian football managers
Campeonato Brasileiro Série A managers
Avaí FC managers
Brazilian expatriate footballers
Brazilian expatriate sportspeople in Spain
Brazilian expatriate sportspeople in Portugal
Brazilian expatriate sportspeople in Qatar
Expatriate footballers in Spain
Expatriate footballers in Portugal
Expatriate footballers in Qatar